There are at least 32 named mountains in Rosebud County, Montana.
 Badger Peak, el. 
 Battle Butte, el. 
 Black Buttes, el. 
 Blacktail Butte, el. 
 Browns Mountain, el. 
 Castle Butte, el. 
 Castle Rock, location unknown, el. 
 Chalky Point, el. 
 Charlie Black Butte, el. 
 Cook Creek Butte, el. 
 Eagle Rock, el. 
 Eagle Rock, el. 
 Fisher Butte, el. 
 Garfield Peak, el. 
 Gobblers Knob, el. 
 Gold Butte, el. 
 Horse Creek Buttes, el. 
 Ice Cream Butte, el. 
 Jack Creek Hill, el. 
 King Mountain, el. 
 Poker Jim Butte, el. 
 Pyramid Butte, el. 
 Rattlesnake Buttes, el. 
 Rosebud Buttes, el. 
 Round Butte, el. 
 Sand Buttes, el. 
 Schoolmarm Buttes, el. 
 Sunday Butte, el. 
 The Big Hill, el. 
 Trembling Butte, el. 
 Twin Tops, el. 
 Wild Hog Butte, el.

See also
 List of mountains in Montana
 List of mountain ranges in Montana

Notes

Landforms of Rosebud County, Montana
Rosebud